Lyces enoides is a moth of the family Notodontidae first described by Jean Baptiste Boisduval in 1870. It is found in Honduras and Mexico.

External links
Species page at Tree of Life Web Project

Notodontidae
Moths described in 1870